Michael Pickering (born 30 November 1963) is a former Australian rules football player who played in the VFL/AFL between 1984 and 1991 for the Richmond Football Club and then from 1992 until 1993 for the Melbourne Football Club.

Pickering was a talented footballer from Vermont whose fine marking was the trademark of his game. Courageous and determined in his approach to the ball Pickering won the Tigers' best and fairest award in 1988. That season he was made vice-captain and led the side well when Weightman was unavailable, he fell out of favour late in 1991 and was traded to Melbourne playing only two seasons with the Demons.

He was appointed as coach of the Fitzroy Football Club in Premier C of the VAFA for the 2012 season.

References 

 Hogan P: The Tigers of Old, Richmond FC, Melbourne 1996

External links
 Demon Wiki profile
 
 

Richmond Football Club players
Melbourne Football Club players
Jack Dyer Medal winners
Australian rules footballers from Victoria (Australia)
1963 births
Living people
People educated at St Kevin's College, Melbourne